Christopher Moore (born January 1, 1957) is an American writer of  comic fantasy. He was born in Toledo, Ohio. He grew up in Mansfield, Ohio, and attended Ohio State University and Brooks Institute of Photography in Santa Barbara, California.

An only child, Moore learned to amuse himself with his imagination. He loved reading and his father brought him plenty of books from the library every week. He started writing around the age of twelve and realized that this was his talent by the time he was 16, and he began to consider making it his career.

Moore's novels typically involve conflicted everyman characters struggling through supernatural or extraordinary circumstances.  With the possible exceptions of Fool, The Serpent of Venice, Sacré Bleu, and Shakespeare for Squirrels: A Novel, all his books take place in the same universe and some characters recur from novel to novel.

According to his interview in the June 2007 issue of Writer's Digest, the film rights to Moore's first novel, Practical Demonkeeping (1992), were purchased by Disney even before the book had a publisher.  In answer to repeated questions from fans over the years, Moore stated that all of his books have been optioned or sold for films, but that as yet "none of them are in any danger of being made into a movie."

Moore has named Kurt Vonnegut, Douglas Adams, John Steinbeck, Tom Robbins, Richard Brautigan, Robert Bloch, Richard Matheson, Jules Verne, Ray Bradbury, H. P. Lovecraft, Edgar Allan Poe and Ian Fleming as key influences on his writing.

As of June 2006, Moore lives in San Francisco, after a few years on the island of Kauai, Hawaii.

Bibliography

Novels 
Most of Moore's novels take place in the same fictional universe since characters from one book frequently turn up as minor characters or have cameos in other books. Some novels with a common protagonist or setting can be grouped into series; however, with the exception of the vampire books and the Death Merchant Chronicles, they can all be read as stand-alone novels.

The Pine Cove Books 
 Practical Demonkeeping (1992)
 The Lust Lizard of Melancholy Cove (1999)
 The Stupidest Angel: A Heartwarming Tale of Christmas Terror (2004) William Morrow 
 The Stupidest Angel: A Heartwarming Tale of Christmas Terror, v. 2.0 (2005) – contains the same text as the above, with an additional 35-page short story at the end

Vampires in San Francisco 
 Bloodsucking Fiends: A Love Story (1995) 
 You Suck: A Love Story (2007) William Morrow 
 Bite Me: A Love Story (2010) William Morrow

Death Merchant Chronicles 
 A Dirty Job (2006) William Morrow 
 Secondhand Souls (2015) HarperCollins Publishers

Chronicles of Pocket the Fool 
 Fool (2009) William Morrow 
 The Serpent of Venice (2014) William Morrow 
 Shakespeare for Squirrels: A Novel (2020) New York: William Morrow

The Tales of Sammy "Two Toes" 
 Noir (2018) New York: William Morrow 
 Razzmatazz (2022) William Morrow ISBN 978-0-06-243412-8

Other novels 
 Coyote Blue (1994) 
 Island of the Sequined Love Nun (1997)
 Lamb: The Gospel According to Biff, Christ's Childhood Pal (2002) William Morrow 
 Fluke, or, I Know Why the Winged Whale Sings (2003) William Morrow 
 Sacré Bleu (2012) William Morrow

Short stories
"Our Lady of the Fishnet Stockings" (1987)
"Cat's Karma" (1987)

Other works
The Griff: A Graphic Novel (2011, co-written with Ian Corson and illustrated by Jennyson Rosero, originally conceived in 2001 as a movie script) William Morrow

References

 "The WD Interview:  Christopher Moore", Writer's Digest, June 2007, pp. 58–62.

External links

 
 
 Interview at Book  Reviews and More
 Interview at Windycon 42 Blog, conducted by John O'Neill, 4/24/2015.
 

1957 births
Living people
Comedians from Ohio
20th-century American novelists
21st-century American novelists
American male novelists
American humorists
American fantasy writers
American humanists
Novelists from Ohio
20th-century American male writers
21st-century American male writers
20th-century American comedians
21st-century American comedians